This table shows an overview of the protected heritage sites in the Flemish town Genk. This list is part of Belgium's national heritage.

|}

See also
 List of onroerend erfgoed in Limburg (Belgium)
Genk

References
 Flemish organization for Immovable Heritage, De Inventaris van het Bouwkundig Erfgoed, 2011

Genk
Genk